Red Rocket may refer to:

 Red rocket (shotgun slug), a 3D-printed shotgun projectile
 Red Rocket 7, a comic book series
 Solent Blue Line, a bus services in the Eastleigh area
 Matt Bonner, basketball player
 Toronto Transit Commission, a nickname for buses and trains operated in the city
 G-series (Toronto subway), nicknamed "Red Rocket", used by the Toronto Transit Commission
 Toronto Rocket, latest rolling stock of the Toronto subway
 "Red Rocket" (poem), a poem by the Slovene constructivist author Srečko Kosovel
 Rocket Red, a comic book character
 Red Rocket, a digital video decoder board made by the Red Digital Cinema Camera Company
 Red Rocket (film) (2021), a comedy-drama film directed by Sean Baker
A euphemism for the exposed glans of a dog's penis